Greenbrier County is a county in the U.S. state of West Virginia. As of the 2020 census, the population was 32,977. Its county seat is Lewisburg. The county was formed in 1778 from Botetourt and Montgomery counties in Virginia.

History
Prior to the arrival of European-American settlers around 1740, Greenbrier County, like most of West Virginia, was used as a hunting ground by the Shawnee and Cherokee nations. They called this land Can-tuc-kee.

Shawnee leaders, including Pucksinwah and later his son Tecumseh, were alarmed by the arrival of the European settlers, who by 1771 had set up extensive trade in the area. The day books of early merchants Sampson and George Mathews recorded sales to the Shawnee that included such luxury items as silk, hats, silver, and tailor-made suits. Shawnee leaders feared the loss of their hunting lands, which were vital to their survival. They believed the white settlers would continue to encroach on their territory downriver on the Ohio.

Confrontations, sometimes violent, increased between the Native Americans and settlers. In 1774, the Earl of Dunmore, then governor of the colonies of New York and Virginia, decided to raise an army of 3,000 men to attack the Shawnees in their homeland in present-day Ohio.  Half of these men were inducted at Fort Pitt, while the other half assembled at Fort Union under the command of General Andrew Lewis. The town of present-day Lewisburg developed around the fort and was named for that commander. By early October of that year, Lewis' force had marched downstream to the mouth of the Kanawha River. They fought the Battle of Point Pleasant against a Shawnee force led by Hokoleskwa, also known as Cornstalk. This site later developed as the town of Point Pleasant, West Virginia.

European settlers were subjected to a number of raids by Native Americans during the colonial period, including a raid on Fort Randolph and later on Fort Donnally, then inhabited by 25 men and 60 women and children. One of the heroic defenders of Fort Donnally  was an African American slave named Dick Pointer. Pointer later addressed the Virginia General Assembly and gave a moving appeal that "in the decline of life" he requested to be freed for his defense of Fort Donnally. Historic accounts differ as to whether the legislature granted his wish. His grave is marked beside Carnegie Hall in the county seat of Lewisburg, and a historical marker stands prominently in the midst of the Lewisburg Cemetery. Pointer's gun is on permanent display at The Greenbrier Historical Society and John A. North House Museum  in Lewisburg.

During the secession crisis of 1861 Greenbrier citizens chose Samuel Price as their delegate to the Richmond convention. On April 17, 1861, the day Virginia's secession ordinance was passed he voted against it, but later changed his mind and signed the official document. When the public vote on the secession ordinance was held on May 23, 1861, Greenbrier county voted 1,000 to 100 in favor of secession. The Civil War came to the county in mid 1861, and several battles were fought in the area, including Lewisburg in May 1862 and White Sulphur Springs in August 1863. Both battles were Union victories. Greenbrier County became part of the new state of West Virginia, although it never participated in any of the votes held by the Restored Government in Wheeling. West Virginia contributed approximately 20,000 men to the Union and an equal amount to the Confederate army, with approximately 2,000 men from Greenbrier county joining the Confederate army.

In 1863, West Virginia's counties were divided into civil townships, with the intention of encouraging local government.  This proved impractical in the heavily rural state, and in 1872 the townships were converted into magisterial districts.  Greenbrier County was initially divided into ten townships: Anthony's Creek, Big Levels, Blue Sulphur, Falling Spring, Fort Spring, Irish Corner, Lewisburg, Meadow Bluff, White Sulphur, and Williamsburg.  Lewisburg District was co-extensive with the town of Lewisburg until 1871, when Big Levels Township was divided between Lewisburg and Falling Spring Townships.  The same year, Summers County was formed from parts of Greenbrier, Fayette, Mercer, and Monroe Counties.  The portion of Greenbrier County that became  part of Summers County belonged to Blue Sulphur Township.  In 1872, the nine remaining townships became magisterial districts.  A tenth district, Frankford, was created from part of Falling Spring District between 1910 and 1920.  In the 1990s the ten historic magisterial districts were consolidated into three new districts: Eastern, Western, and Central.

What is claimed to be the oldest golf course in the United States was founded in 1884 just north of White Sulphur Springs by the Montague family.

The famous "Greenbrier Ghost" trial occurred at Sam Black Church.  Zona Heaster Shue, the wife of Edward Shue, was found dead on January 23, 1897.  The coroner initially listed her cause of her death as "everlasting faint", then as "childbirth."  Shue's mother, Mary Jane Heaster, testified in court that her daughter's ghost had visited her on four separate occasions, claiming that her neck had been broken by her husband, who had strangled her in a fit of rage.  Shue's body was exhumed, and based on the results of an autopsy, Edward Shue was tried and convicted of murder.  A historical marker located along U.S. Route 60 at Sam Black Church describes it as the "[o]nly known case in which testimony from [a] ghost helped convict a murderer."

During the decade prior to World War II, several Civilian Conservation Corps (CCC) camps were located along the Greenbrier River.

For most of the 20th century, the Meadow River Lumber Company operated the world's largest hardwood sawmill in Rainelle.

During World War II The Greenbrier hotel was used as a military hospital. Sections were used as an internment center for Axis diplomats who were stranded in the United States during the war.  When the war ended, the military returned the hotel to private control, and it re-opened as a hotel. During the years of the Cold War, a large underground bunker was built beneath a section of new construction at the hotel, to serve as a secret Congressional refuge in case of nuclear attack. It was one of the sites to be used as part of the United States Continuity of Operations Plan. After it was reported in a 1992 article, following the fall of the Soviet Union, the US government decommissioned it as a government site.

In the June 2016 floods that affected the state of West Virginia, Greenbrier County suffered 16 casualties, the most of any county.

Geography
It is the second-largest county in West Virginia by area.

Much of the area of the northern and western parts of the county is either public (Monongahela National Forest), coal land, or private forest, owned by companies such as MeadWestvaco and CSX.

In 2005, Invenergy, LLC of Chicago Illinois announced plans to build the $300 million, 124-turbine Beech Ridge Wind Farm along the tops of several Greenbrier County mountains.  The wind farm would produce 186 megawatts of electricity.  Development, which was originally expected to begin in late 2007, was stalled when the state Supreme Court agreed to hear the case brought by opponents of the project. Ultimately, The Supreme Court ruled in favor of the developers, clearing the way for construction to begin in the summer of 2009.  However, in July of that year, a U.S. District Court in Maryland agreed to hear a case filed by opponents.

Adjacent counties

Webster County (north)
Pocahontas County (northeast)
Bath County, Virginia (east)
Alleghany County, Virginia (southeast)
Monroe County (south)
Summers County (southwest)
Fayette County (west)
Nicholas County (northwest)

National protected areas
 Lost World Caverns
 Monongahela National Forest (part)
 Organ Cave System
  Greenbrier State Forest
  Washington/Jefferson National Forest (WV/VA Line)

Demographics

2000 census
As of the census of 2000, there were 34,453 people, 14,571 households, and 9,922 families residing in the county.  The population density was 34 people per square mile (13/km2).  There were 17,644 housing units at an average density of 17 per square mile (7/km2).  The racial makeup of the county was 95.23% White, 3.04% Black or African American, 0.34% Native American, 0.19% Asian, 0.01% Pacific Islander, 0.15% from other races, and 1.04% from two or more races.  0.68% of the population were Hispanic or Latino of any race.

There were 14,571 households, out of which 27.60% had children under the age of 18 living with them, 54.20% were married couples living together, 10.70% had a female householder with no husband present, and 31.90% were non-families. 28.60% of all households were made up of individuals, and 13.40% had someone living alone who was 65 years of age or older.  The average household size was 2.32 and the average family size was 2.83.

In the county, the population was spread out, with 21.60% under the age of 18, 7.70% from 18 to 24, 26.10% from 25 to 44, 26.90% from 45 to 64, and 17.70% who were 65 years of age or older.  The median age was 42 years. For every 100 females there were 92.50 males.  For every 100 females age 18 and over, there were 88.80 males.

The median income for a household in the county was $26,927, and the median income for a family was $33,292. Males had a median income of $26,157 versus $19,620 for females. The per capita income for the county was $16,247.  About 14.50% of families and 18.20% of the population were below the poverty line, including 23.70% of those under age 18 and 16.00% of those age 65 or over.

2010 census
As of the 2010 United States census, there were 35,480 people, 15,443 households, and 9,903 families residing in the county. The racial makeup of the county was 94.6% white, 2.8% black or African American, 0.4% Asian, 0.3% American Indian, 0.4% from other races, and 1.5% from two or more races. Those of Hispanic or Latino origin made up 1.2% of the population. In terms of ancestry, 17.8% were Irish, 17.0% were German, 12.0% were English, and 10.0% were American.

Of the 15,443 households, 26.1% had children under the age of 18 living with them, 48.9% were married couples living together, 10.8% had a female householder with no husband present, 35.9% were non-families, and 30.6% of all households were made up of individuals. The average household size was 2.26 and the average family size was 2.79. The median age was 45.0 years.

The median income for a household in the county was $33,732 and the median income for a family was $43,182. Males had a median income of $34,845 versus $27,254 for females. The per capita income for the county was $20,044. About 14.7% of families and 19.4% of the population were below the poverty line, including 23.5% of those under age 18 and 13.6% of those age 65 or over.

Politics

Law and government
Like all West Virginia Counties, Greenbrier County is governed by a three-person, elected County Commission.  Other elected officers include the Sheriff, County Clerk, Circuit Clerk, Assessor, Prosecuting Attorney, Surveyor, and three Magistrates.

Education

Public schools
Greenbrier County's public schools are operated by the Greenbrier County Board of Education, which is elected on a non-partisan basis.   The Superintendent of Schools, who is appointed by the Board, provides administrative supervision for the system.  Each school is administered by a Principal and, in some cases, one or more Assistant Principals.  The School Board Office is located on Chestnut Street in Lewisburg. Following a trend in West Virginia, schools at the secondary level are consolidated, while elementary schools continue to be located within small communities.

 Alderson Elementary School
 Crichton Elementary School
 Eastern Greenbrier Middle School
 Frankford Elementary School
 Greenbrier East High School
 Greenbrier West High School
 Lewisburg Elementary School
 Rainelle Elementary School
 Ronceverte Elementary School
 Rupert Elementary School
 Smoot Elementary School
 Western Greenbrier Middle School
 White Sulphur Springs Elementary School

Private Schools
 Greenbrier Community School (Formerly Greenbrier Episcopal School)
 Seneca Trail Academy
 Renick Christian School
 Lewisburg Baptist Academy

Former Schools (Incomplete)
 Alderson High/Jr. High School
 Alvon/Neola School (Near White Sulphur Springs)
 Baldwin School
 Boling School 
 Brushy Flat School
 Charmco School
 Chestnut Ridge School
 Crichton High/Jr. High 
 Crawley School
 East Rainelle School
 Frankford High/Jr. High School
 Friars Hole School
 Greenbrier Church/School (Bingham Mountain)
 Greenbrier High/Jr.High School (Ronceverte)
 Lewisburg Intermediate School
 Lewisburg Elem./Jr. High School (Lewisburg High/Jr./Elem.)
 May School
 Mill Spring School
 Mt. Vernon School
 New Piedmont School
 Rainelle Christian Academy (RCA) 
 Rainelle High/Jr. High School
 Renick High/Jr. High School
 Renick Elementary School
 Rockcamp School
 Rupert High/Jr. High School
 Smoot High/Jr. High School
 Snowflake School
 Sugar Grove School
 Vires School
 White Sulphur Springs High/Jr. High School 
 Whiteoak Grove School
 Williamsburg High/Jr. High School
 Williamsburg Elementary School

Other
 Alternative/Home Schooling (County-wide)
 Greenbrier Nursing School (Located at Greenbrier East High School)
 West Virginia State Virtual School

Colleges and universities
 New River Community and Technical College (NRCTC), Lewisburg Branch
 West Virginia School of Osteopathic Medicine (WVSOM)

Transportation

Airports
Greenbrier Valley Airport is a single runway airport 3 miles north of Lewisburg, West Virginia. Scheduled flights to Washington Dulles International Airport are provided by United Express.

Railroads

Amtrak, the national passenger rail service, provides service to White Sulphur Springs and Alderson under the Cardinal route.

Major highways

 Interstate 64
 U.S. Route 60
 U.S. Route 219
 West Virginia Route 12
 West Virginia Route 20
 West Virginia Route 39
 West Virginia Route 55
 West Virginia Route 63
 West Virginia Route 92

Communities

Cities
 Lewisburg (county seat)
 Ronceverte
 White Sulphur Springs

Towns
 Alderson (Partially located in Monroe County) 
 Falling Spring (Also known as Renick)
 Quinwood
 Rainelle
 Rupert

Census-designated place
 Fairlea

Magisterial Districts
 Central
 Eastern
 Western

Historical Districts
 Anthony's Creek - represented by Mayor Terry "Mountain" McLaughlin 
 Big Levels
 Blue Sulphur
 Falling Spring (Sometimes Falling Springs)
 Fort Spring
 Frankfort
 Irish Corner
 Lewisburg
 Meadow Bluff
 White Sulfur
 Williamsburg

See also
 Beartown State Park
 Beech Ridge Wind Farm
 Greenbrier Hotel, (The)
 Greenbrier River
 Greenbrier River Trail
 John Stuart (Virginia)
 Meadow River
 Meadow River Lumber Company
 Monongahela National Forest
 National Register of Historic Places listings in Greenbrier County, West Virginia
 List of magisterial districts in West Virginia

Footnotes

References

External links

Greenbrier County Official Website
Greenbrier County Convention & Visitors Bureau
Greenbrier Valley Economic Development Corporation
Greenbrier County Schools
Greenbrier State Forest
WVGenWeb Greenbrier County

 
1778 establishments in Virginia
Populated places established in 1778
Counties of Appalachia